Malvas District is one of five districts of the province Huarmey in Peru.

See also 
 Kunkush Kancha
 Ututu Hirka

References

Districts of the Huarmey Province
Districts of the Ancash Region